Fernando Balzaretti (June 10, 1946 – September 5, 1998) was a Mexican actor.

Career
Balzaretti began his acting career in the 1960s and by the time of his death in 1998 had acted in at least 40 films, 21 telenovelas and 136 plays.  He was also a professor of performing arts at the Universidad Nacional Autónoma de México.

Awards
Ariel Award for Best Supporting Actor (1988) in Muelle Rojo.
Virginia Fábregas Medal, 1994.

Selected filmography
 Length of War (1976)
 Mina, Wind of Freedom (1977)
 Broken Flag (1978)
 Días dificiles (1988) (Ariel nominee for Best Actor)
 Muelle rojo (1988) (Ariel winner for Best Supporting Actor)
 Kino (1994) (Ariel nominee for Best Supporting Actor)

See also
 Mexican people of Italian descent

References

External links
 

1946 births
1998 deaths
Male actors from Mexico City
Mexican male telenovela actors
Mexican male film actors
Mexican people of Italian descent
20th-century Mexican male actors
Best supporting male actors Ariel Award winners